Jannes Fittje (born 22 July 1999) is a German racing driver from Waltershausen and is currently driving in the 2019 Porsche Mobil 1 Supercup for Team Project 1 - Fach.

Career

Karting
Fittje enjoyed a successful karting career, winning in Germany and Europe. His first championship was in Germany at the age of 11 in 2011.

ADAC Formula 4 Championship
In 2015, Fittje made his single-seater debut in the ADAC F4 championship with Team Motopark. He finished the season 18th with 22 points. In 2016, Fittje got on the podium for the first time in his single seater career where he finished 3rd at Oschersleben. He had 2 more podiums that season, finishing the season 7th with 133 points.

GP3
In 2018 Fittje replaced David Beckmann at Jenzer for the final 5 races of the GP3 Season. Fittje finished the season with 0 points and his highest finished was 10th at Sochi.

Porsche Supercup
Fittje competed one race in the 2019 Porsche Mobil 1 Supercup for Team Project 1 - Fach in Spain where he recorded one point by finishing 16th.

Racing record

Career summary

* Season still in progress.

Complete ADAC Formula 4 Championship results 
(key) (Races in bold indicate pole position) (Races in italics indicate fastest lap)

Complete GP3 Series results
(key)

Complete GT World Challenge Europe Endurance Cup results

*Season still in progress.

References

External links
 

1999 births
Living people
German racing drivers
German GP3 Series drivers
People from Waltershausen

Karting World Championship drivers
ADAC GT Masters drivers
ADAC Formula 4 drivers
Euroformula Open Championship drivers
Porsche Supercup drivers
Motopark Academy drivers
US Racing drivers
Fortec Motorsport drivers
Jenzer Motorsport drivers
Drivex drivers
RP Motorsport drivers
24H Series drivers